Hertali is a fissure vent in Ethiopia. The fissure vent is believed to have been active through the late Pleistocene to Holocene.

References
 

Fissure vents
Volcanoes of Ethiopia